Piergiorgio Bellocchio (15 December 1931 – 18 April 2022) was an Italian writer, literary critic and journalist.

Life and career 
The brother of the film director Marco, Bellocchio became first known as the founder and editor of the left-wing anti-Marxist political magazine Quaderni piacentini ("Piacenza Notebooks", 1962-1984). After the closure of Quaderni he founded and directed the magazine Diario (1985-1993). He was the first editor-in-chief of the far-left Lotta Continua newspaper, and he also collaborated as a columnist with other publications including Panorama and L'Unità. 

Bellocchio published books with Mondadori, Rizzoli, Einaudi, Baldini Castoldi Dalai Editore, and directed the publishing house Gulliver. His style has been described as "a mixture of satire, aphorisms and glimpses of narrative and reality, expressed in an always very clear writing".

References

External links 
 Piergiorgio Bellocchio at Open Library
 

1931 births
2022 deaths
People from Piacenza
Italian writers
Italian essayists
Italian literary critics